Equini is the only living tribe of the subfamily Equinae, which has lived worldwide (except Australia) since the Hemingfordian stage of the Middle Miocene (16–0 mya). It is considered to be a monophyletic clade.

Taxonomy
Tribe: Equini
 Genus: † Astrohippus
 Genus: † Calippus
 Genus: † Dinohippus
 Genus: Equus – living horses, asses, and zebras
 Genus: † Haringtonhippus
 Genus: † Hippidion
 Genus: † Onohippidium
 Genus: † Pliohippus
 Genus: † Protohippus

References

Equidae
Miocene horses
Pliocene odd-toed ungulates
Pleistocene horses